"I'm a People" is a song by George Jones. It became a No. 6 hit single when it was released on the Musicor label in 1966. The song was written by Dallas Frazier, one of Jones' favorite composers at the time. "I'm a People" is one of the oddest novelties Jones ever recorded; the song compares the seemingly carefree existence of monkeys at a zoo with the dreary human enterprise of securing employment.

Discography

1966 singles
George Jones songs
Songs written by Dallas Frazier